The 2013–14 Rugby-Bundesliga was the 43rd edition of this competition and the 94th edition of the German rugby union championship. In the Rugby-Bundesliga, twenty-four teams played in, initially, four regional divisions, the first stage of the competition, followed by a championship round of sixteen clubs and, finally, the play-offs consisting of twelve teams. The season started on 24 August 2013 and finished with the championship final on 21 June 2014 in Pforzheim, interrupted by a winter break from 8 December to 22 February. The regular season finished on 19 April and the play-offs started on 3 May, with the German championship final held on 21 June 2014, which was contested between TV Pforzheim and Heidelberger RK. Heidelberg won its fifth consecutive national championship when it defeated Pforzheim 43–20 in the final.

The defending champions were Heidelberger RK who defeated SC Neuenheim in the 2013 final to take out its ninth championship and fourth in a row. Heidelberger RK remained unbeaten throughout the 2013–14 regular season, as it had been all throughout the 2012–13 Rugby-Bundesliga season, having last lost in the Bundesliga on 1 November 2011, when HRK was beaten 26–24 by TV Pforzheim.

Overview

The league saw only minor changes compare to the previous season, playing at full strength of 24 clubs in 2013–14 instead of only 22. Promoted to the league were 08 Ricklingen/Wunstorf, TuS 95 Düsseldorf and Veltener RC while RC Luxembourg had withdrawn from the competition.

The first stage of the competition, the Vorrunde, saw four six-team groupes in which each team played the other five just once. This stage finished in late September after which the second stage started, the Qualifikationsphase, in which the top teams each from the southern and the western group play each other in one group while the top teams from the north and east play each other in another. A new addition compare to the previous season was that the fourth placed team from each division would play the fifth placed in the opposite group to determine the last two places in the second round. The six teams not qualified for the Qualifikationsphase entered the DRV-Pokal, the German rugby union cup, together with the top eight teams of the 2nd Bundesliga. The 2nd Bundesliga teams not qualified for the DRV-Pokal in turn played for the Liga Pokal.

In the second stage the teams within a group would play each other in a home-and-away format, with the teams that already played each other in the first stage carrying over those results. Of the sixteen clubs the best six in each group now qualified for the knock-out stage. The knock-out stage was played in a single-game format with the higher seeded team enjoying home advantage and the winner advancing to the next round.

Bundesliga tables & results

First stage
In the first stage twenty-four clubs played in four groups. Within each group each team played the other just once. The best three teams advanced directly to the second stage while the teams placed fourth and fifth had to play a qualifying decider.

North
The division table:

 Relegated: 08 Ricklingen/Wunstorf (withdrawn)
 Promoted: none

East
The division table:

 Relegated: Veltener RC, USV Potsdam Rugby
 Promoted: RU Hohen Neuendorf, SG Siemensstadt/Grizzlies

West
The division table:

 Relegated: RC Mainz, TuS 95 Düsseldorf
 Promoted: none

South
The division table:

 SC Neuenheim and Heidelberger TV deducted two points each.
 Relegated: none
 Promoted: none

Qualifying matches
Four qualifying matches were held to determine the last four clubs to enter the second stage. The fourth placed club in the southern division played the fifth placed team in the western division and the fourth placed western club the fifth placed southern team. The same system applied to the northern and eastern division. The winners of the four games advanced to the second stage while the losers had to enter the DRV-Pokal.

North-East

South-West

Second stage
In the second stage sixteen clubs played in two groups of eight clubs each.  Within each group each team played the others home and away except for the match-ups that already had been played in the first round. The results of those were carried over. The best six teams in each group qualified for the play-offs and were seeded according to the final standings.

North-East
The division table:

 08 Ricklingen/Wunstorf withdrew at the end of March 2014 because of a lack of players and was removed from competition, an automatic process after failing to field a team on two occasions.

South-West
The division table:

 ASV Köln Rugby deducted two points for failing to field in the away game against TV Pforzheim on 12 December 2013.

Play-off stage
In the play-offs the twelve qualified teams played four rounds. The best two clubs in each division received a bye for the first round and entered in the quarter finals stage. The first round was played on 26 April, with one game held a week later. The quarter finals were held on 3 May, except one game which was held on 10 May. The semi finals were held on 17 May, followed by a break of over one month before the final was played on 21 June:

DRV-Pokal tables & results
The eight worst clubs in the first stage of the Bundesliga entered the DRV-Pokal for 2013–14, together with the eight best clubs from the 2nd Rugby-Bundesliga. The DRV-Pokal ranks as a second tier to the German championship but also functioned as a qualifying competition for the 2014–15 Rugby-Bundesliga. The modus for the DRV-Pokal was the same as for the German championship, with a second stage with two divisions of eight teams, followed by the play-offs made up of the best twelve teams, with the top two in each division receiving a bye for the first round.

Group stage

North-East
The division table:

South-West
The division table:

 ‡ Denotes 2013–14 Bundesliga club.

Play-off stage
The 2013–14 final was played on 28 June 2014 in Rottweil. The play-offs for the DRV-Pokal started on 10 May 2014. The final was originally to be contested between RC Leipzig and Heidelberger TV but Leipzig's semi final win against RC Rottweil was later converted into a win for Rottweil because the former used an ineligible player.

References

External links 
 rugbyweb.de - Rugby-Bundesliga table & results 
 Totalrugby.de - Bundesliga table & results 
 Rugby-Bundesliga at scoresway.com

2013–14
2013–14 in German rugby union
Germany